Leominster abbey was an Anglo-Saxon monastery established at Leominster in the county of Hereford, England.  The name of the town refers to its minster, a settlement of clergy living a communal life.

The monastery, perhaps founded in the seventh century, was originally a male house. After being destroyed by Danes, it was rebuilt as a Benedictine abbey for nuns (see Leominster nunnery).
In 1046 the abbess, Eadgifu, was abducted by Sweyn Godwinson.  Eadgifu is only abbess known by name. The convent was probably dissolved or suppressed not long after this incident.

In the 12th century Henry I incorporated land at Leominster into the foundation of Reading Abbey.
Whether the priory was built on the site of the original Anglo-Saxon monastery is not clear. However, archaeological evidence of Saxon activity has been uncovered at the priory.

References

Further reading 
 Kemp, B. R. "The Foundation of Reading Abbey" English Historical Review 1968 p. 505 and following

External links
 "Saxon Rule", Herefordshire Through Time
 Leominster Priory (official website)

Benedictine nunneries in England
Monasteries in Herefordshire
Christian monasteries established in the 7th century